Live At the Westbeth Theater is the tenth live spoken word album by Henry Rollins, released on February 28, 2001 on 2.13.61 Records. It was recorded on December 11, 1999 at the Westbeth Theater in New York City.

Track listing

Disc 1
 "Intro" - 4:01
 "Canadians Are On the Move!" - 1:58
 "Jr. Pilot League" - 6:09
 "Worcester Mass." - 2:10
 "Mars Needs Aryans" - 8:07
 "I Smell A Ratt (I)" - 7:44
 "I Smell A Ratt (II)" - 9:17
 "I Smell A Ratt (III)" - 10:09
 "I Smell A Ratt (IV)" - 13:47
 "I Smell A Ratt (V)" - 3:00

Disc 2
 "Back After the Break" - 0:32
 "As the Crow Flies" - 5:20
 "The Undoing of A Man (I)" - 4:10
 "The Undoing of A Man (II)" - 2:29
 "The Undoing of A Man (III)" - 5:29
 "The Undoing of A Man (IV)" - 15:25
 "The Undoing of A Man (V)" - 11:42

Credits
Henry Rollins - Production & Editing
Vance Garcia - Recording
Rae Di Leo - Editing
Phil Klum - Mastering
Dave Chapple - Design
Frederike de Jonge - Photography
Richard Bishop - Management
Mike Curtis - Tour Manager

References                 

2001 live albums
Henry Rollins live albums
Live spoken word albums
Live comedy albums
Spoken word albums by American artists
2.13.61 live albums
Stand-up comedy albums